The 2008 Stratford-on-Avon District Council election took place on 1 May 2008 to elect members of Stratford-on-Avon District Council in Warwickshire, England. One third of the council was up for election and the Conservative Party stayed in overall control of the council.

After the election, the composition of the council was
Conservative 32
Liberal Democrat 19
Independent 2

Background
Before the election the Conservatives had a 21-seat majority with 37 councillors, as compared to 14 for the Liberal Democrats and 2 independents. 19 seats were being contested in the election, which was expected to be fought mainly between the Conservatives and Liberal Democrats.

Election result
The results saw the Liberal Democrats make 5 gains to reduce the Conservatives majority on the council. 3 of the gains for the Liberal Democrats came in the wards of Stratford-upon-Avon itself, along with 2 in Harbury and Shipston. Meanwhile, the one independent councillor who was up for election, Kim James, successfully held his seat in Bidford and Salford ward, defeating the Liberal Democrat candidate by 185 votes.

The losses for the Conservatives were one of the worst performances by the party in the 2008 local elections, in contrast to the national picture where they made strong gains.  Meanwhile, the Liberal Democrat leader, Nick Clegg described the Stratford election as "an excellent result".

Ward results

References

2008 English local elections
2008
2000s in Warwickshire